John Walker (1866–1921) was a Scottish footballer who played for Burnley, Clyde, Manchester City, Stoke and Sunderland.

He did not play for Leicester Fosse as previously reported. That John Walker had been signed from Everton in 1895.

Career statistics
Source:

References

Scottish footballers
Association football defenders
Burnley F.C. players
Clyde F.C. players
Sunderland A.F.C. players
Stoke City F.C. players
Manchester City F.C. players
English Football League players
1921 deaths
1866 births